Neda Maghbouleh is an American sociologist, scholar, writer, author, and educator. She is the Canada Research Chair in Migration, Race, and Identity and associate professor of Sociology at the University of Toronto Mississauga.

Biography
Neda Maghbouleh was born in New York City, and raised in Portland, Oregon. She attended Smith College (B.A. 2004); University of California, Santa Barbara (M.A. 2008 and PhD 2012). She moved to Canada with her family in 2013 for work.

Her book The Limits of Whiteness: Iranian Americans and the Everyday Politics of Race (2017; Stanford University Press) looked at historical and legal evidence, as well as the sociological structures of how Iranian Americans have moved between the categorization of white and "not white" in race. It is about the people of all MENA communities, but it specifically centers around Iranians. The Limits of Whiteness also discusses the "Aryan narrative" used to describe Iranians by both the people in Iran and by the diaspora, and the formation of biases. When the book was first published many older Iranian Americans did not understand or agree with the book, but after Executive Order 13769 (also known more commonly as "Trump travel ban") in early 2017 many felt a more complicated relationship to race due to new legal challenges and restrictions.

She has been recognized as an authority on the racialization of migrants from the Middle Eastern and North African (MENA) region, and has written for CBC Radio, Newsweek, NPR's Code Switch, Salon.com, Vice, and Vox Media. In 2021–2022, she was honored as a Wall Scholar by the Peter Wall Institute for Advanced Studies.

Publications

See also
 Anti-Iranian sentiment
 Definitions of whiteness in the United States

References

External links
 Video: ChaiTime, featuring Maghbouleh taking about systemic racism in July 2020, Harvard Iranian Alumni, Harvard University
 Video: The Limits of Whiteness: Iranian Americans and the Everyday Politics of Race, presentation by Maghbouleh in October 2017, Center for Iranian Diaspora Studies at San Francisco State University

Living people
Educators from New York City
Educators from Portland, Oregon
American people of Iranian descent
American women sociologists
American women academics
American women social scientists
Middle Eastern studies scholars
Academic staff of the University of Toronto Mississauga
Smith College alumni
University of California, Santa Barbara alumni
21st-century women educators
Year of birth missing (living people)
Iranian diaspora studies scholars